Sherrill is a city in Dubuque County, Iowa, United States. The population was 189 at the time of the 2020 census, up from 186 in 2000.

History 
Sherrill was named for two brothers, Adam and Isaac Sherrill, and was originally called Sherrill's Mound or Mount, since the city is at the base of a prominent hill. In 1856, Peter Fries, an Austrian immigrant, built a large, stone inn at the main crossroads of the city. It was popular with newlyweds, and Jesse James and his gang were reported to have stayed there before their famous raid on Northfield, Minnesota. The structure has survived and been restored as the Black Horse Inn. Large numbers of German immigrants settled in Sherrill and the surrounding rural area in the 19th century. German Catholic (SS. Peter and Paul), German Lutheran (St. Matthew), German Methodist, and German Evangelical churches were founded and remain active. Sherrill was one of ten "Beer Towns" incorporated in Dubuque County in 1933 to ensure that the city's taverns could serve beer, under a possibly mistaken interpretation of Iowa law that licenses to dispense beer could only be granted to premises inside incorporated places. Sherrill's post office was established in 1858, with Peter Fries as postmaster. Its Zip Code is 52073.

Geography
Sherrill is located at  (42.602857, -90.782139).

Demographics

2010 census
As of the census of 2010, there were 177 people, 73 households, and 54 families living in the city. The racial makeup of the city was 94.9% White, 2.3% African American, and 2.8% from other races. Hispanic or Latino of any race were 2.8% of the population.

There were 73 households, of which 31.5% had children under the age of 18 living with them, 63.0% were married couples living together, 6.8% had a female householder with no husband present, 4.1% had a male householder with no wife present, and 26.0% were non-families. 24.7% of all households were made up of individuals, and 15.1% had someone living alone who was 65 years of age or older. The average household size was 2.42 and the average family size was 2.89.

The median age in the city was 42.5 years. 23.7% of residents were under the age of 18; 9.1% were between the ages of 18 and 24; 19.8% were from 25 to 44; 24.2% were from 45 to 64; and 23.2% were 65 years of age or older. The gender makeup of the city was 52.5% male and 47.5% female.

2000 census
As of the census of 2000, there were 186 people, 70 households, and 52 families living in the city. The racial makeup of the city was 100.00% White. Hispanic or Latino of any race were 2.15% of the population.

There were 70 households, out of which 31.4% had children under the age of 18 living with them, 68.6% were married couples living together, 5.7% had a female householder with no husband present, and 24.3% were non-families. 20.0% of all households were made up of individuals, and 12.9% had someone living alone who was 65 years of age or older. The average household size was 2.66 and the average family size was 3.13.

In the city, the population was spread out, with 27.4% under the age of 18, 4.8% from 18 to 24, 26.3% from 25 to 44, 22.6% from 45 to 64, and 18.8% who were 65 years of age or older. The median age was 40 years. For every 100 females, there were 104.4 males. For every 100 females age 18 and over, there were 101.5 males.

The median income for a household in the city was $38,125, and the median income for a family was $44,688. Males had a median income of $31,250 versus $20,000 for females. The per capita income for the city was $21,118. None of the families and 3.3% of the population were living below the poverty line.

Gallery

References

Further reading
 Lyon, Randolph W., et al. Faith and Fortunes — An Encyclopedia of Dubuque County, Dubuque, Iowa: Flynn Printing and Graphics, 1998.

External links 

 
 City Data Comprehensive Statistical Data and more about Sherrill, Iowa

|

Cities in Dubuque County, Iowa
Cities in Iowa